John Jost Gaetz (June 6, 1859 – December 24, 1937) was a provincial politician from Alberta, Canada. He served as a member of the Legislative Assembly of Alberta from 1918 to 1921 sitting with the Liberal caucus in government.

Early life
Gaetz moved to the Red Deer area with his mother Catherine Gaetz in the fall of 1885. They applied for and got homesteads in the area. The area is now known as the Gaetz Lakes Sanctuary.

Political career
Gaetz ran for a seat as the Liberal candidate in a by-election held on October 28, 1918. He won the district easily over Conservative candidate F.W. Galbraith.

Gaetz ran for a second term in the 1921 Alberta general election. He was easily defeated by United Farmers candidate George Smith in a two way race.

Gaetz attempted to win his seat back in the 1926 Alberta general election. He faced off against Smith for the second time and Conservative candidate William Payne. The race was hotly contested Gaetz finished third and was eliminated on the first count. His second preferences put Smith over the top.

References

External links
Legislative Assembly of Alberta Members Listing

1859 births
1937 deaths
Alberta Liberal Party MLAs
People from Red Deer, Alberta